Aspidogyne mendoncae is a species of orchid that grows in Brazil.

Biology 
Aspidogyne mendoncae grows in humus on the floor of lowland forests, in the Brazilian state of Espirito Santo.

Taxonomic history 
Aspidogyne mendoncae was first described by Alexander Curt Brade and Guido Frederico João Pabst in 1958, under the name Erythrodes mendoncae. In 1977, Leslie Andrew Garay transferred the species to a new, monotypic genus, Rhamphorhynchus, as Rhamphorhynchus mendoncae. In 2008, Paul Ormerod concluded that the genus Rhamphorhynchyus could not be maintained as separate from Aspidogyne, creating the current combination, Aspidogyne mendoncae.

References 

mendoncae
Endemic orchids of Brazil
Orchids of Espírito Santo
Plants described in 1958